Dircenna is a genus of clearwing (ithomiine) butterflies, named by Edward Doubleday in 1847. They are in the brush-footed butterfly family, Nymphalidae. The genus comprises fairly large ithomiines with elongated forewings which are characterized by quite straight costae and distinctively shaped discal cells. They occur from Mexico to Southern Brazil. Larvae feed on plants from the family Solanaceae, such as Solanum and Brunfelsia.

Species
Arranged alphabetically:
Dircenna adina (Hewitson, 1855)
Dircenna dero (Hübner, 1823) — Dero Clearwing
Dircenna jemina (Geyer, [1837])
Dircenna klugii (Geyer, 1837) — Klug's Clearwing
Dircenna loreta Haensch, 1903
Dircenna olyras (C. & R. Felder, [1865])

References 

Ithomiini
Nymphalidae of South America
Nymphalidae genera